A Girl Guide  or Girl Scout is a member of a section of some Guiding organisations who is between the ages of 10 and 14. Age limits are different in each organisation. The term Girl Scout is used in the United States and several East Asian countries. The two terms are used synonymously within this article.

Girl Guides are organised into units/troops averaging 15–30 girls under guidance of a team of leaders. Units subdivide into patrols of about six Guides and engage in outdoor and special interest activities. Units may affiliate with national and international organisations. Some units, especially in Europe, have been co-educational since the 1970s, allowing boys and girls to work together as Scouts. There are other programme sections for older and younger girls.

Foundation

Following the origin of the Boy Scouts in 1907 many girls took up Scouting. A group of Girl Scouts were prominent at the Crystal Palace Rally in 1909. After Robert Baden-Powell formed The Boy Scouts Association in 1910 he formed the Girl Guides and asked his sister Agnes to look after the Girl Guides organisation. A few years later Baden-Powell's new wife Olave St. Claire Baden-Powell (commonly referred to as "Lady Baden-Powell") became involved and, in 1918, was appointed Chief Guide.

Activities

Most activities are similar to those of the (Boy) Scouts, but two central themes have been present from the earliest days of the movement: domestic skills and "a kind of practical feminism which embodies physical fitness, survival skills, camping, citizenship training, and career preparation".

Unit affiliation

Troop

Local groups, called variously units, companies or troops, are the fundamental unit of the Girl Guides. These are run by an adult, normally a woman who is between 18 and 65 years of age. She has responsibility for the girls in her group and plans out activities for the girls as well as leading the meetings. These leaders are supported by assistants. Meetings are held anywhere from weekly to monthly depending on the commitments of the participants and the activities in progress.

See also

World Thinking Day

References